North Bergen is a township in the northern part of Hudson County, in the U.S. state of New Jersey. As of the 2020 United States census, the township's population was 63,361, an increase of 2,588 (+4.3%) from the 2010 census count of 60,773, which in turn reflected an increase of 2,681 (+4.6%) from the 58,092 counted in the 2000 census. The township was incorporated in 1843. It was much diminished in territory by a series of secessions. Situated on the Hudson Palisades, it is one of the hilliest municipalities in the United States. Like neighboring North Hudson communities, North Bergen is among those places in the nation with the highest population density and a majority Hispanic population.

History

Colonial era
At the time of European colonization the area was the territory of Hackensack tribe of the Lenape Native Americans, who maintained a settlement, Espatingh, on the west side of the hills and where a Dutch trading post was established after the Peach Tree War. In 1658, Peter Stuyvesant, then Director-General of New Netherland, repurchased from them the area now encompassed by the municipalities of Hudson County east of the Hackensack River. In 1660 he granted permission to establish the semi-autonomous colony of Bergen, with the main village located at today's Bergen Square, considered to be the first chartered municipality in what would become the state of New Jersey. At the time, the area of North Bergen was heavily forested, traversed by paths used by the indigenous and colonizing population and became known as Bergen Woods, a name recalled in today's neighborhood of Bergenwood.

After the 1664 surrender of Fort Amsterdam the entire New Netherland colony came into the possession of the British, who established the Province of New Jersey. In 1682, the East Jersey legislature formed the state's first four counties, including Bergen County, which consisted of all the land in the peninsula between the Hackensack and Hudson Rivers; that is, the eastern portions of what today is Bergen and Hudson Counties. In 1693, Bergen County was divided into two townships: Hackensack Township in the north, and Bergen Township, encompassing the Bergen Neck peninsula, in the south. The border between the two townships is the current Hudson-Bergen county line.

While settlement was sparse, communities developed along the Bergen Turnpike at the Three Pigeons and Maisland, later New Durham. French botanist André Michaux developed his gardens nearby. On the Hudson River, Bulls Ferry became an important landing for crossings to Manhattan. While ostensibly under British control during the American Revolutionary War, the area was patrolled by the Americans on foraging, espionage, and raiding expeditions; most notably the Battle of Bull's Ferry.

Toponymy, secession, and urbanization
On February 22, 1838, Jersey City was incorporated as a separate municipality, and in 1840 Hudson County, comprising the city and Bergen Township, was created from the southern portion of Bergen County. North Bergen was incorporated as a township on April 10, 1843, by an act of the New Jersey Legislature, from the northern portion of Bergen Township. At the time, the town included everything east of the Hackensack River and north of and including what is now Jersey City Heights.

The entire region that is now known as North Hudson experienced massive immigration and urbanization during the latter half of the 19th century, and led to the creation of various new towns. Portions of the North Bergen were taken to form Hoboken Township (April 9, 1849, now the City of Hoboken), Hudson Town (April 12, 1852, later part of Hudson City), Hudson City (April 11, 1855, later merged with Jersey City), Guttenberg (formed within the township on March 9, 1859, and set off as an independent municipality on April 1, 1878), Weehawken (March 15, 1859), Union Township and West Hoboken Township (both created on February 28, 1861), Union Hill town (March 29, 1864) and Secaucus (March 12, 1900). During this era many of Hudson County's cemeteries were developed along the town's western slope of the Hudson Palisades.

At their foot in the Meadowlands, the Erie, the New York, Susquehanna and Western and the West Shore railroads ran right-of-ways to their terminals on the Hudson, the last building its tunnel through Bergen Hill at North Bergen. The area was important destination during peak German immigration to the United States and is recalled today in Schuetzen Park, founded in 1874. Further north, Nungesser's Guttenberg Racetrack became a notable and notorious destination which, after its closing, became a proving ground for new technologies: the automobile and the airplane.

20th century
The development of Hudson County Boulevard, which skirts around the west, north and east of North Bergen, was completed in the early 20th century. By 1913 it was considered to be fine for "motoring". The roadway is now known by its two sections: Kennedy Boulevard and Boulevard East.

Residential districts along and between the two boulevards were developed. Bergenline Avenue, a broad street which accommodated the North Hudson County Railway streetcars to Nungesser's became (and remains) an important commercial and transit corridor. The two boulevard sections met at Bergenline Avenue, at the northwest corner of North Hudson/Braddock Park.

Soon after the opening of the Lincoln Tunnel Approach, the Susquehanna Transfer was opened in August 1939 to accommodate passengers who wished to transfer to buses through the tunnel to the Port Authority Bus Terminal. It closed in 1966.

At the time of its construction in 1949, the  WOR TV Tower, in the midst of the residential Woodcliff Section, was the tenth-tallest man-made structure in the world. The tower was dismantled in 1956 but in 1967, about half a mile (2500 m) to the east, the 34-story,  Stonehenge apartment building was constructed on the tip of the Palisades.

In the early 1960s two notable paleontological finds of fossils from the Newark Basin were made near the foot of the cliffs at one of several former quarries, the Granton, of which today's avenue is a namesake. The former quarry remained an archeological site until at least 1980.

North Hudson Park was renamed the James J. Braddock North Hudson County Park. In 1935, while living in North Bergen, local hero James J. Braddock won the world heavyweight championship in one of the most stunning upsets in boxing history.

In contrast to other Hudson County communities during the latter half of the century, North Bergen grew significantly in population. Many residents are part of the wave of Spanish language speakers which had begun in the 1960s with Cuban émigrés, leading to the nickname, Havana on the Hudson.

Geography

In 1850, the township was roughly rectangular. When the municipalities along the Hudson River (what are now Guttenberg, West New York, Union City and Weehawken) broke away, it left North Bergen roughly an inverted "L", or  "axe-shaped". Its northern section stretches east–west and is south of the Bergen County communities of Cliffside Park, Edgewater, Fairview and Ridgefield. To the east, the Hudson River creates the shared border with the borough of Manhattan in New York City. It shares a border with Carlstadt in the Hackensack River. Its north–south section lies between Secaucus to the west and to the east Guttenberg, West New York and Union City, with which it meets Jersey City at a single point at its southern end. According to the United States Census Bureau, the township had a total area of 5.57 square miles (14.43 km2), including 5.14 square miles (13.30 km2) of land and 0.44 square miles (1.13 km2) of water (7.83%).

North Bergen has diverse geological features. Partially situated on the Hudson River, the Hudson Palisades rise from the waterfront, while the northern part of the town sits atop the plateau. The cuesta, or slope, on its west side makes North Bergen the city with the second-most hills per square mile in the United States after San Francisco, some of which are extremely steep. A rock formation along the slope (located at ) is composed of unusual serpentinite rock and made up of small rock cliffs. Because of this, it is one of the few undeveloped parts of North Bergen. Low-lying areas along the west side are part of the New Jersey Meadowlands. The unusual shape and diverse topography of North Bergen have created diverse historical and contemporary neighborhoods:

 Bergenline Avenue runs to Nungessers at the Fairview border near North Hudson Park. It has been described as the longest commercial avenue in the state, with over 300 retail stores and restaurants.
 The Racetrack section, between Bergenline and Kennedy Boulevard on the plateau.
 Bergenwood, on the steep slopes of the west side of the Palisades.
 New Durham, site of colonial American Three Pigeons near the Bergen Turnpike and Tonnelle Avenue.
 Meadowview, behind the Municipal Building between the many cemeteries.
 Bulls Ferry, on the Hudson waterfront, site of Roc Harbor, Palisades Medical Center and the Hudson River Waterfront Walkway
 Babbitt, in the Meadowlands district, a part of which is a wetlands preserve known as the Eastern Brackish Marsh.
 Woodcliff on The Palisades around the North Hudson Park.
 Transfer Station near the tripoint with Union City and Jersey City near Paterson Plank Road, Kennedy Boulevard, and Secaucus Road in Secaucus.

Other historical unincorporated communities, localities and place names located partially or completely within the township include Homestead, Granton, Hudson Heights, New Durham, Shadyside, Three Pigeons and Tyler Park.

The town has seven cemeteries, more than any other town in the county, including some, such as Weehawken Cemetery and Hoboken Cemetery, that were at one time designated for other towns. This may be due to the layout of the county in the late 19th and early 20th centuries, with North Bergen having more land than its more densely populated neighbors, which had to bury their dead outside of town. It may also date back to the Civil War era. Among these cemeteries are Flower Hill Cemetery and Grove Church Cemetery.

Demographics

2010 census

2000 census
As of the 2000 United States census there were 58,092 people, 21,236 households, and 14,249 families residing in the township.  The population density was 11,179.6 people per square mile (4,313.4/km2). There were 22,009 housing units at an average density of 1, 634.2/km2 (4,235.5/sq mi).  The racial makeup of the township was 67.36% White, 2.72% African American, 0.40% Native American, 6.47% Asian, 0.05% Pacific Islander, 15.53% from other races, and 7.47% from two or more races. Hispanic or Latino of any race were 57.25% of the population.

There were 21,236 households, out of which 32.0% had children under the age of 18 living with them, 47.4% were married couples living together, 14.2% had a female householder with no husband present, and 32.9% were non-families. 27.7% of all households were made up of individuals, and 11.2% had someone living alone who was 65 years of age or older.  The average household size was 2.70 and the average family size was 3.33.

In the township the population was spread out, with 22.7% under the age of 18, 9.0% from 18 to 24, 33.1% from 25 to 44, 21.4% from 45 to 64, and 13.8% who were 65 years of age or older.  The median age was 36 years. For every 100 females, there were 91.5 males.  For every 100 females age 18 and over, there were 87.7 males.

Males had a median income of $35,626 versus $29,067 for females. The per capita income for the township was $20,058.  About 9.6% of families and 11.1% of the population were below the poverty line, including 14.0% of those under age 18 and 14.5% of those age 65 or over.

Economy
North Bergen has several retail districts, along Bergenline Avenue, Tonnelle Avenue, and near Transfer Station. Portions of the city are part of an Urban Enterprise Zone (UEZ), one of 32 zones covering 37 municipalities statewide. Union City was selected in 1996 as one of a group of seven zones added to participate in the program. In addition to other benefits to encourage employment and investment within the UEZ, shoppers can take advantage of a reduced 3.3125% sales tax rate (half of the % rate charged statewide) at eligible merchants. Established in April 1995, the city's Urban Enterprise Zone status expires in April 2026. The zone was established based on legislation passed in February 1995 through the efforts of Senator Sacco, one of the sponsors of legislation creating the zones.

Hudson News and Liz Claiborne are large employers. New York, Susquehanna and Western Railway operates five intermodal freight transport facilities within the township.

Government

Local government
North Bergen has been governed under the Walsh Act form of New Jersey municipal government since 1931. The township is one of 30 municipalities (of the 564) statewide that use the form of government. The governing body is comprised of five commissioners elected at-large to the Township Committee in non-partisan elections to serve four-year terms of office on a concurrent basis. After each election, each individual is assigned to head one of the five commissions and the commissioners select one of their members to serve as mayor.

, members of the North Bergen Township Committee are 
Mayor Nicholas Sacco (Commissioner of Public Affairs), 
Hugo D. Cabrera (Commissioner of Parks and Public Property), 
Frank Gargiulo (Commissioner of Public Works), 
Julio Marenco (Commissioner of Revenue and Finance) and 
Allen Pascual (Commissioner of Public Safety), all serving concurrent terms of office ending in May 2023.

Corruption
After serving as Township Clerk from 1971 to 1979, local political leader Joseph Mocco was arrested on August 7, 1986, on charges of illegally dumping tons of construction material within North Bergen and other nearby communities. Mocco was convicted and began serving a prison sentence in July 1995. Mocco was paroled in 1999, with several special conditions imposed on him upon his release by the New Jersey State Parole Board designed to prohibit him from working or participating in local elections.

In February 2004, Peter Perez, former commissioner in charge of Parks and Recreation, was sentenced to serve six months in a federal prison for accepting kickbacks and bribes from a contractor who had several business contracts with the township. He received a reduced sentence in light of his cooperation with authorities.

On March 27, 2008, North Bergen Athletic Director Jerry Maietta and Guidance Counselor Ralph Marino were among 45 men swept up in a Bergen County raid. Bergen County Prosecutors described the two as lower level operatives in an expansive network of bookies, package holders, drug dealers and drug distributors. Other transactions included knock off woman purses and human organs.

On September 11, 2012, North Bergen's Superintendent of the Department of Public Works James Wiley pleaded guilty to one count of second degree conspiracy to commit official misconduct. Wiley was convicted for using the town's resources to participate in political campaigns. In November 2015, two DPW supervisors were sentenced to five years in prison, following their convictions on charges that they had directed department workers to work on political campaigns and perform work on behalf of supervisors and other officials.

In 2013, a report issued by the office of the New Jersey State Comptroller revealed that an attorney for North Bergen made $18,800 a year plus health benefits, but township officials had no idea what he was doing, or whether he was even at work. It was reported that he was hired between the years of 1988 and 1990. He had been actively working until 2006, when he had a falling out with a township official and stopped receiving legal work. Despite not being assigned work, the attorney told investigators that throughout his employment with the township, he was routinely solicited to make political contributions to Nick Sacco's political allies. His contributions in 2012 to this committee totaled $6,600.

Federal, state and county representation

North Bergen is located in the 8th Congressional District and is part of New Jersey's 32nd state legislative district.

Politics
As of March 2011, there were a total of 30,595 registered voters in North Bergen, of which 18,816 (61.5%) were registered as Democrats, 2,462 (8.0%) were registered as Republicans and 9,301 (30.4%) were registered as Unaffiliated. There were 16 voters registered to other parties.

In the 2012 presidential election, Democrat Barack Obama received 78.1% of the vote (15,600 cast), ahead of Republican Mitt Romney with 21.1% (4,209 votes), and other candidates with 0.8% (164 votes), among the 20,134 ballots cast by the township's 32,627 registered voters (161 ballots were spoiled), for a turnout of 61.7%. In the 2008 presidential election, Democrat Barack Obama received 69.6% of the vote here (14,791 cast), ahead of Republican John McCain with 28.7% (6,100 votes) and other candidates with 0.8% (169 votes), among the 21,254 ballots cast by the town's 34,402 registered voters, for a turnout of 61.8%. In the 2004 presidential election, Democrat John Kerry received 65.4% of the vote here (12,783 ballots cast), outpolling Republican George W. Bush with 33.5% (6,541 votes) and other candidates with 0.4% (118 votes), among the 19,540 ballots cast by the town's 30,540 registered voters, for a turnout percentage of 64.0.

In the 2013 gubernatorial election, Democrat Barbara Buono received 60.5% of the vote (6,802 cast), ahead of Republican Chris Christie with 38.2% (4,296 votes), and other candidates with 1.3% (147 votes), among the 11,704 ballots cast by the township's 33,134 registered voters (459 ballots were spoiled), for a turnout of 35.3%. In the 2009 gubernatorial election, Democrat Jon Corzine received 73.9% of the vote here (9,680 ballots cast), ahead of Republican Chris Christie with 22.3% (2,922 votes), Independent Chris Daggett with 1.5% (200 votes) and other candidates with 1.2% (151 votes), among the 13,106 ballots cast by the town's 28,555 registered voters, yielding a 45.9% turnout.

Public safety
The North Bergen Police Force was founded in 1923, replacing the peace force known as "roundsmen", who began patrolling the township at night in 1907.

North Bergen's fire department merged with those of the neighboring communities of Guttenberg, Union City, West New York and Weehawken in 1999 to form North Hudson Regional Fire and Rescue (NHRFR). Engine 1, Engine 6, Engine 9 / Battalion 3, Engine 13 and Ladder 5 are all located in North Bergen.

NHRFR and North Bergen Emergency Medical Services (headquartered at 63rd Street and Granton Avenue) were among the many Hudson County agencies that responded to the January 2009 crash of Flight 1549, as did Palisades Medical Center, where 57 of the survivors were treated for injuries.

Education

The North Bergen School District serves students in kindergarten through twelfth grade. As of the 2018–19 school year, the district, comprised of seven schools, had an enrollment of 7,576 students and 581.8 classroom teachers (on an FTE basis), for a student–teacher ratio of 13.0:1. Schools in the district (with 2018–19 enrollment data from the National Center for Education Statistics) are 
Franklin School (612 students; in grades 1–8), 
Robert Fulton School (1,180; K–8), 
John F. Kennedy School (529; 1–8), 
Lincoln School (1,355; Pre-K–8), 
Horace Mann School (1,111; 1–8), 
McKinley School (334; K–8) and 
North Bergen High School (2,376; 9–12) Students from Guttenberg attend the district's high school as part of a sending/receiving relationship with the Guttenberg Public School District.

North Bergen had been the location of High Tech High School, a county magnet school for ninth through twelfth grades. The Hudson County Schools of Technology constructed a new site for the school in Secaucus at a cost of $160 million, which opened for the 2018–19 school year. The former High Tech High School campus was acquired by the North Bergen district, which plans to construct a new junior high school for grades 7–9 on the site.

A Step Ahead Preschool is a private pre-K through kindergarten school established in 1993.

Transportation

Roads and highways

Several major roadways traverse North Bergen. Route 495 travels between the Lincoln Tunnel and the New Jersey Turnpike (Interstate 95), with interchanges for Route 3 and U.S. Route 1/9, which runs north–south on the western edge side of the township. County Route 501 (Kennedy Boulevard) and County Route 505 (River Road) pass through on the eastern side of the township.

Public transportation

Public transportation in North Bergen is provided by bus and light rail service.
Hudson-Bergen Light Rail (HBLR) service is available at the Tonnelle Avenue station and Bergenline Avenue station (in Union City) to points in Weehawken, Hoboken, Jersey City and Bayonne.

Bus service is provided along busy north–south corridors on Kennedy Boulevard, Bergenline Avenue, and Boulevard East by NJ Transit and privately operated dollar vans within Hudson County, and to Bergen and Manhattan, New York City. Nungessers is a major origination and transfer point. Lines terminating at Port Authority Bus Terminal in Midtown Manhattan are the 121, 125, 127, 128, 154, 156, 158, 159, 165, 166, 168, 320 routes. The 181 and 188 lines  terminate at George Washington Bridge Bus Terminal in Upper Manhattan. Lines 22, 23, 83, 84, 85, 86, 88 and 89 terminate either at Journal Square or Hoboken Terminal. The 751 travels to Edgewater and Hackensack.

Jitney commuter buses operate along Bergenline Avenue, providing service to the Port Authority Bus Terminal, the George Washington Bridge Bus Station, the Newport Centre and other local destinations. The county's most frequent route for dollar buses, jitneys operate along Bergenline Avenue as frequently as one bus every minute, some operated by Spanish Transportation.

Media and culture
North Bergen is located within the New York media market, with most of its daily papers available for sale or delivery. The Jersey Journal is a local daily paper based in Jersey City. Local weeklies include the free bilingual paper, Hudson Dispatch Weekly, (named for the former daily Hudson Dispatch), North Bergen Reporter (part of The Hudson Reporter group of local weeklies), and the Spanish language El Especialito. River View Observer is a monthly newspaper that covers the Hudson Waterfront market. Online news HudsonCountyView.com, HudsonTV.com, and the HudPost.com all cover local North Bergen news.

In the late 2000s, North Bergen, Weehawken, Union City, Guttenberg, and West New York came to be dubbed collectively as "NoHu", a North Hudson haven for local performing and fine artists, many of whom are immigrants from Latin America and other countries, in part due to lower housing costs compared to those in nearby art havens such as Hoboken, Jersey City and Manhattan.

Notable people

People who were born in, residents of, or otherwise closely associated with North Bergen include:

 070 Shake (born ), stage name of rapper Danielle Balbuena
 Mohamed Mahmood Alessa, charged in 2010 with conspiring to join a terrorist group and kill, maim, and kidnap people outside the U.S.
 Carlos Alomar (born 1951), musician, musical director, songwriter
 Christopher Amoroso (1972–2001), Port Authority Police Department (PAPD) officer who died in the September 11, 2001, terrorist attacks
 Kyle Anderson (born 1993), NBA basketball player for the Memphis Grizzlies
 Rick Apodaca (born 1980), Puerto Rican professional basketball player who has played in the NCAA, USBL, NBDL, and the National Superior Basketball League of Puerto Rico
 Coco Austin (born 1979), actress, dancer, model and wife of rapper/actor Ice-T 
 Lidia Bastianich (born 1947), chef, Emmy Award-winning television host, author, and restaurateur
 Odell Beckham Jr. (born 1992), wide receiver for the New York Giants
 James J. Braddock (1905–1974), heavyweight boxing champion from 1935 to 1937
 John O. Brennan (born 1955), Deputy National Security Advisor for Homeland Security in the Obama White House
 James L. Brooks (born 1940), television and film director
 Dan Callandrillo, former professional basketball player
 Edd Cartier (1914–2008), pulp magazine illustrator
 Richard Castellano (1933–1988), American actor
 C. Judson Child Jr. (1923–2004), seventh bishop of the Episcopal Diocese of Atlanta
 Gene Cornish (born 1944), guitarist and harmonica player who is an original member of the 1960s blue-eyed soul band The Rascals
 Leo Cullum (1942–2010), cartoonist best known for his work in The New Yorker
 Frank Cumiskey (1912–2014), artistic gymnast who competed in the 1932 Summer Olympics, in the 1936 Summer Olympics, and in the 1948 Summer Olympics
 Paquito D'Rivera (born 1948), musician, composer
 Joey Diaz (born 1963), stand-up comedian and actor
 Henry Escalante, pop musician, one of 15 finalists from 2007 season of MTV reality show Making Menudo
 Edward Feigenbaum (born 1936), computer scientist who collaborated on the development of the first expert system Dendral
 Lucio Fernandez, Cuban-American politician and entertainer, who served as the city's Commissioner of Public Affairs
 Louis Freeh (born 1950), former FBI director
 Melissa Fumero (born 1982), actress best known for her role as Amy Santiago in the comedy series Brooklyn Nine-Nine.
 Greg Herenda (born 1961), former head coach of the Fairleigh Dickinson Knights men's basketball team
 Ice-T (born 1958), rap music pioneer and actor
 Dan Kurzman (1922–2010), military historian
 AJ Lee (born 1987), professional wrestler signed to WWE
 Lionel Loueke (born 1973), African Jazz guitarist and sideman to Herbie Hancock
 Luigi Lucioni (1900–1988), painter known for his realistic and precisely drawn still lifes, landscapes, and portraits. Lucioni's family emigrated from Malnate, Italy in 1911 to New York City, and then subsequently lived for a time in North Bergen
 Steve Mocco (born 1981), Olympic wrestler
 Ed Murawinski (born 1951), award-winning cartoonist for the Daily News
 Fred Orlofsky (born 1937), retired artistic gymnast who competed at the 1960 Summer Olympics
 Jesse Pike (1890–1986), cyclist who competed in two events at the 1912 Summer Olympics
 Bill Raisch (1905–1984), dancer and actor, known as the One-Armed Man pursued by Richard Kimble (David Janssen) on the 1963-67 TV series The Fugitive
 Feisal Abdul Rauf (born 1948), Muslim imam, author and activist
 Evan Rodriguez (born 1988), NFL fullback and tight end for the Tampa Bay Buccaneers
 Wilbur Ross (born 1937), investor and former banker
 Nicholas Sacco (born 1946), politician who has served in the State Senate and as Mayor of North Bergen
 John Scarne (1903–1985), author, expert on gambling, card games and magic tricks
 Herbert H. Shaw (1930–2016), independent politician and perennial candidate who has run for office more than 75 times over five decades under the "Politicians Are Crooks" banner
 Rena Sofer (born 1968), actress
 Robert Sundholm (born 1941), outsider artist
 Lou Tepe (born 1930), offensive lineman who played for three seasons with the Pittsburgh Steelers
 Terese Terranova (born 1947), retired para table tennis player who won two gold medals at the 1988 Summer Paralympics
 Guy F. Tozzoli (1922–2013), directed development of the World Trade Center
 Hal Turner (born 1962), far-right political commentator and radio host
 Yordenis Ugás (born 1986) amateur lightweight boxer
 Anthony P. Vainieri (born 1928), politician who served in the New Jersey General Assembly from the 32nd Legislative District from 1984 to 1986
 Mariusz Wach (born 1979), heavyweight boxer

In popular culture
 Oak Hill, a low-budget film starring Sally Kirkland, and directed by former Guttenberg mayor Peter Lavilla, about three former entertainers whose depression and addiction has led them to a homeless shelter, was filmed in both Union City's PERC homeless shelter, and a synagogue in North Bergen. In 2008, it was entered into the Sundance, Tribeca, and Hoboken Film Festivals.
 Cinderella Man, a film starring Russell Crowe as boxer James J. Braddock, depicted North Bergen during the Great Depression. A city park bears his name.
North Bergen was the production base for the NBC drama Law & Order: Special Victims Unit, with scenes set in the police station and courtroom filmed on a stage at NBC's Central Archives building on West Side Avenue.
 Meat Men is a Food Network reality show about Pat LaFrieda Meat Purveyors, a North Bergen-based family-owned and -operated meat supplier.

See also
North Bergen Reporter
North Hudson, New Jersey
Hudson River Waterfront Walkway
Hackensack RiverWalk

References

External links

 
1843 establishments in New Jersey
New Jersey Meadowlands District
New Jersey Urban Enterprise Zones
North Hudson, New Jersey
Populated places established in 1843
New Jersey populated places on the Hudson River
Townships in Hudson County, New Jersey
Walsh Act